Feilian, also known as Xie Feng is the Chinese god of the wind, or Feng Bo.  He is a winged dragon with the head of a deer and the tail of a snake. He carries wind with him in a bag and stirs up trouble. Feilian is kept in check by Houyi, the heavenly archer. He assists Chiyou in a fight against the Yellow Emperor

References

Shang dynasty people
Chinese dragons
Chinese gods
Wind deities